Patrick Maxwell Renna (born March 3, 1979) is an American actor and film producer best known for his role as Hamilton "Ham" Porter in the 1993 baseball film The Sandlot. Some of his more recent projects include, Bad Roomies, which is Patrick's first film as a producer, a recurring role on Netflix's hit GLOW and most recently the independent film Boys of Summer, which was released in the summer of 2022.

Filmography

Film
 The Sandlot (1993) – Hamilton 'Ham' Porter
 Son in Law (1993) – Zack Warner
 Summertime Switch (1994) – Modem
 Beanstalk (1994) – Danny
 The Big Green (1995) – Larry Musgrove
 Blue River (1995) – Zoltan
 Johnny Mysto: Boy Wizard (1996) – Glenn
 Sometimes They Come Back... Again (1996) – Young Alan
 Address Unknown (1997) – Bernie Libassi
 Falling Sky (1998) – Mark
 Born Bad (1999) – Evan
 The Secret Life of Girls (1999) – Patrick
 Speedway Junky (1999) – Bud
 Dill Scallion (1999) – Patrick
 P.U.N.K.S. (1999) – Lanny Nygren
 Everyday (1999) – Buddy Holly Death Worried Guy 
 Poor White Trash (2000) – Ricky Kenworthy
 Very Mean Men (2000) – Donny Mulroney
 Say You Love Satan (2000) – Ollie
 Boys Klub (2001) – Country
 Recess: School's Out (2001) (voice) – Jerome
 The Contract (2002) – Jerry the clerk
 The Chocolate Fairy (2002) – Bad Boy
 National Lampoon Presents Dorm Daze (2003) – Styles McFee
 Golf Cart Driving School (2004) – Gene
 Gamebox 1.0 (2004) – Kaplan
 The Sandlot 2 (2005) - Hamilton 'Ham' Porter, Flashback scene
 Dark Ride (2006) – Bill

 Life Blood (2009) – Dan
 Bad Roomies (2015)
 Lavalantula (2015) – Chris
 Fear, Inc. (2016)

Television
 Salute Your Shorts (1992) - Danucci Peed His Pants Kid, episode "Citizen Pinsky"
Boy Meets World (1996) - Kyle
 Arliss (1996) – Delivery Man
 Home Improvement (1996), Todd, episode Mr. Wilson's Opus
 The X-Files (1998) – Ronnie Strickland, episode "Bad Blood"
 ER (1999) – Howie, episode "Truth & Consequences"
 Judging Amy (2002–2003) – Ronnie Thayer, 2 episodes
 The Closer (2005) – Jeffrey
 Over There (2005) – Medic, 2 episodes
 Boston Legal (2005–2007) – Warren Peters, 3 episodes
 CSI: Crime Scene Investigation (2007) – Security Guard
 Bones (2014) – Pete Dineen
 Hell's Kitchen (2017) – Himself
 GLOW (2018) – Cupcake

Music videos
 Houses – Fast Talk (2018) – Ronald Early
 Jax - 90s Kids (2021) - Himself

References

External links
 

1979 births
Living people
American male child actors
American male film actors
American male television actors
Male actors from Boston